Pelorus Jack (fl. 1888 – April 1912) was a Risso's dolphin (Grampus griseus) that was famous for meeting and escorting ships through a stretch of water in Cook Strait, New Zealand. The animal was reported over a 24 year period, from 1888 until his disappearance after 1912. Pelorus Jack was usually spotted in Admiralty Bay between Cape Francis and Collinet Point, near French Pass, a notoriously dangerous channel used by ships travelling between Wellington and Nelson.

While it is claimed in the British book Breverton's nautical curiosities : a book of the sea that he was named after the pelorus, a marine navigational instrument, Te Ara - the Encyclopedia of New Zealand explains that, based on local knowledge, the name came from Pelorus Sound / Te Hoiere because it was at the entrance to that stretch of water where he would regularly meet ships to accompany them.

Pelorus Jack was shot at from a passing ship, and was later protected by a 1904 New Zealand law.

Appearance 

Although its sex was never determined, it was identified from photographs as a Risso's dolphin, Grampus griseus. This is an uncommon species in New Zealand waters, and only 12 Risso's dolphins have been reported in that area.

History 

Pelorus Jack guided the ships by swimming alongside a water craft for 20 minutes at a time. If the crew could not see Jack at first, they often waited for him to appear.

Despite his name, he did not live in nearby Pelorus Sound / Te Hoiere; instead, he would often guide ships through dangerous passages of French Pass. However, some local residents familiar with his habits claim that he never went through French Pass itself but stayed near the Chetwode Islands.

Pelorus Jack was first seen around 1888 when he appeared in front of the schooner Brindle when the ship approached French Pass, a channel located between D'Urville Island and the South Island. When the members of the crew saw the dolphin bobbing up and down in front of the ship, they wanted to kill him, but the captain's wife talked them out of it. To their amazement, the dolphin then proceeded to guide the ship through the narrow channel. And for years thereafter, he safely guided almost every ship that came by. With rocks and strong currents, the area is dangerous to ships, but no shipwrecks occurred when Jack was present.

Many sailors and travellers saw Pelorus Jack, and he was mentioned in local newspapers and depicted in postcards.

Jack was last seen in April 1912. There were various rumours connected to his disappearance, including fears that foreign whalers might have harpooned him. However, research suggests that Pelorus Jack was an old animal; his head was white and his body pale, both indications of age, so it is likely that he died of natural causes.

Since 1989, Pelorus Jack has been used as a symbol for the Interislander, a ferry service across the Cook Strait, and is incorporated into the livery of the ships in the fleet.

Shooting incident 

In 1904, someone aboard the SS Penguin tried to shoot Pelorus Jack with a rifle. Despite the attempt on his life, Pelorus Jack continued to help ships. According to folklore, however, he no longer helped the Penguin, which shipwrecked in Cook Strait in 1909.

Protection 

Following the shooting incident, a law was proposed to protect Pelorus Jack. He became protected by Order in Council under the Sea Fisheries Act on 26 September 1904. Pelorus Jack remained protected by that law until his disappearance in 1912. It is believed that he was the first individual sea creature protected by law in any country.

Cultural references
In 1945, when Bob Lowry founded his new press, Pelorus Press, in Auckland, his printer's device was a dolphin, referencing 16th century Venetian printer Aldus Manutius, and he named the press after Pelorus Jack. "It was a happy thought to maintain the old dolphin tradition. What more inevitable then ... than Pelorus Jack of the Sounds?"

Kipa Hemi Whiro, a kaumātua of Ngāti Kuia is reported in 1913 as being "very positive in his belief" that Pelorus Jack was "the self-same fish of ancient days", Kaikai-a-waro, a sea-god or taniwha who had guided his ancestor Matua-hautere across Cook Strait from the North Island to settle in the South Island many generations earlier.

"Pelorus Jack" is a Scottish country dance, named in honour of the dolphin. This dance features a set of alternating tandem half-reels (or heys) where two people act as one but swap who leads at the reel ends. It is also known as a Dolphin Reel.

Arthur Ransome mentions Pelorus Jack as accompanying ships and receiving protection in his 1932 novel Peter Duck. However, the character of Peter Duck incorrectly locates the dolphin as living in Sydney Harbour.
Singer/songwriter Andrea Prodan tells the tale of the dolphin in the song "Pelorus Jack" on his 1996 all-vocal record Viva Voce.

Two bulldogs, named Pelorus Jack I (1913–1916) and Pelorus Jack II (1916–1919), served as mascots of HMS New Zealand, the battlecruiser that the New Zealand government paid to have built for the Royal Navy.

The Cornish poet, broadcaster and teacher Charles Causley (1917–2003) retells the story of Pelorus Jack in a 44-line, traditionally crafted poem titled "Pelorus Jack" in his Collected Poems 1951–2000.

See also
Opo (dolphin)
Moko (dolphin)
Fungie
List of individual cetaceans

References

Further references
 Ross E Hutchins and Jerome P Connolly – The saga of Pelorus Jack (1971)
 Edmund Lindop and Jane Carlson – Pelorus Jack (1964)

External links
 Famous wild dolphins
 The Quest for Pelorus (PDF)

1912 animal deaths
Individual dolphins
Solitary dolphins
History of the Marlborough Region
Cook Strait
Individual animals in New Zealand
Animals in mythology
Marine life in popular culture
Individual wild animals